Magneta Lane was a Canadian indie rock band formed in 2003 in Toronto. Magneta Lane disbanded in 2014.

Biography
The all-female line-up consisted sisters Lexi Valentine (vocals and guitar) and Nadia King (drums), and their high school friend French (bass). The group formed after Valentine and King, then aged 16 and 15 years old respectively, attended a concert in Toronto and met the band backstage, deciding that watching a concert was not satisfying enough. The trio came together in the fall of 2003 and spent the next year teaching themselves how to play their instruments and playing shows in and around their native Toronto.

The band released its debut EP, The Constant Lover (EP), in 2004 on Paper Bag Records. The full-length album Dancing with Daggers followed in 2006, and then the band moved to Last Gang Records for 2009's Gambling with God. Following Gambling with God, however, the band ran into label and management changes, and took some time off before reemerging in 2013 with the EP Witchrock. That album was released on the band's own new Splendor House label, with distribution by eOne Music. The band also appeared in k-os' video for "The Dog Is Mine".

Magneta Lane disbanded in 2014. Valentine and King later started a synth/dance pop project called LOLAA.

Discography

EPs
 The Constant Lover (EP) (2004, Paper Bag Records) 
 Witchrock (2013, eOne Music)

Albums
 Dancing with Daggers (2006, Paper Bag Records)
 Gambling with God (2009, Last Gang Records)

Singles
 "The Constant Lover"
 "Ugly Socialite"
 "Cheap Linguistics"
 "Broken Plates"
 "Wild Gardens"
 "Lady Bones"
 "Burn"
 "Lucky"

Music videos

References

Musical groups established in 2003
Musical groups from Toronto
Canadian indie rock groups
All-female bands
Garage punk groups
Paper Bag Records artists
2003 establishments in Ontario
Canadian garage rock groups